Marte Høie Gjefsen (born 6 March 1989) is a Norwegian freestyle skier. She represented Norway at the 2010 Winter Olympics in Vancouver. Gjefsen placed first in the World Cup competition in ski cross in Canada 20 January 2010.

She won the gold medal in Women's Skier X at the 2012 Winter X Games in Aspen, Colorado.

References

External links
 
 
 
 
 

1989 births
Living people
Norwegian female freestyle skiers
Olympic freestyle skiers of Norway
Freestyle skiers at the 2010 Winter Olympics
Freestyle skiers at the 2014 Winter Olympics
X Games athletes
Sportspeople from Lillehammer
21st-century Norwegian women